KXUL (91.1 FM, "91x New Rock") is a radio station  broadcasting an Alternative rock music format. Licensed to Monroe, Louisiana, United States, the station is currently owned by University of Louisiana at Monroe.

References

External links

Radio stations in Louisiana
Mass media in Monroe, Louisiana
College radio stations in Louisiana
University of Louisiana at Monroe